The  is a river flowing through Fukui Prefecture, Japan. It has its source at the Aburasaka Pass (油坂峠 Aburasaka-tōge) in the city of Ōno and empties into the Sea of Japan near the city of Sakai.

River system
Some of the main rivers that flow into the Kuzuryū River include: the Itoshiro River, the Hino River, the Asuwa River and the Takeda River

River communities
The river passes through or forms the boundary of the communities listed below.

Fukui Prefecture
Ōno, Katsuyama, Eiheiji, Fukui, Sakai

References

External links
 (confluence with Ibi River)

Rivers of Fukui Prefecture
Rivers of Japan